Mohamad Mohamad Khalid, known professionally as Mamat Khalid (6 April 1963 – 24 October 2021) was a Malaysian screenwriter, film director, and occasional actor. He was the younger brother of cartoonist Datuk Mohammad Nor Khalid, better known as Lat.

Apart of his career as a film director, Mamat was a founder and owner of his cafe, Sarang Art Hub which is located at Tanjung Malim and opened in 2016.

Life and career
Mamat was born on 6 April 1963 in Ipoh, Perak. As a young boy, he used to go to the cinemas every other day to catch the latest movies. Unfortunately, his hobby did not resonate well with his father, who banned him from frequenting cinemas even on his deathbed. However, that did not break the young Mamat's passion for films.

Before venturing into film-making, Mamat worked in a government office. He was a fan of rock music, having joined an amateur band named Drop Out in 1986 where he was the band's keyboardist. The experiences that he had gone through during this phase inspired him to write and direct his 2005 film Rock, in which its commercial success led into three sequels - Rock Ooo…! (2013), Rock Bro! (2016) and Rock 4: Rockers Never Dai (2020).

He cited the late director P. Ramlee as one of his filmmaking heroes.

Personal life
Mamat married Hasmah Hassan on 12 April 1987, six days after his 24th birthday, and they have five children, namely three sons and two daughters. His fourth child, Amen Khalid also follows his footsteps in the film industry.

Illness and death
On 21 April 2017, Mamat was admitted to the Intensive Care Unit (ICU) of the Ampang Puteri Hospital after complaining of breathing difficulties at about 3 in the morning after having some coffee with his friends. He was believed to have extreme fatigue after attending the preview session of his latest movie, Lebuhraya Ke Neraka in Bukit Bintang. Mamat however remained in stable condition albeit under a doctor's monitoring due to his high blood pressure.

He died on 24 October 2021 at the age of 58 due to heart disease at the Slim River Hospital at 12.30 am. Mamat reportedly collapsed at his Sarang Art Hub restaurant in Tanjung Malim. He was buried at the Masjid Paloh Muslim Cemetery in Ipoh at about 2.25 pm.

Filmography

Film

Television series

Television movie

Television

Awards and nominations

Notes

References

External links 
 

People from Perak
Malaysian film directors
1963 births
2021 deaths
Malay-language film directors
Malaysian people of Malay descent
Malaysian screenwriters
Male screenwriters
Malaysian male writers
20th-century screenwriters
20th-century Malaysian writers
20th-century male writers
21st-century screenwriters
21st-century Malaysian writers